Jane Lowry (February 11, 1937  November 15, 2019) was an American actress primarily known for her theater work on Broadway and regional theater, as well as her singular leading role in Alfred Sole's horror film Alice, Sweet Alice (1976).

A native of Minnesota, Lowry studied theater at Northwestern University under Alvina Krause. She began her career in experimental off-off-Broadway theater, appearing in numerous Joe Cino-produced plays at New York City's Caffe Cino. She later landed roles on Broadway in Poor Bitos in 1964, and as the understudy in the role of Julia in Tennessee Williams's A Delicate Balance, staged at the Martin Beck Theatre in 1966.

In the 1970s, she starred in several productions for the Circle Repertory Company, and made her feature debut as Annie DeLorenze in Alice, Sweet Alice (1976). In 1981, she appeared in the ABC Afterschool Special My Mother Was Never a Kid opposite Holland Taylor.

Biography

Early life
Lowry was born in Minneapolis, Minnesota on February 11, 1937 and raised in Wayzata. Her father, Goodrich Lowry, was a banking executive and the son of Thomas Lowry, founder of the Twin City Rapid Transit Company.

She attended the Northrop Collegiate School in Minneapolis before completing her high school education at Miss Hall's School, a boarding school in Pittsfield, Massachusetts. Lowry graduated with a degree in theater from Northwestern University, studying under Alvina Krause. While at Northwestern, she appeared in a production of Cherry Orchard, directed by Krause.

Career
Lowry began her theater career in New York appearing in off-off-Broadway stage productions at Caffe Cino for theater producer Joe Cino, and quickly became a favorite of his. She appeared in And He Made Her, a Biblical-themed play, as Eve in 1961, which was staged at the Cherry Lane Theatre. She next starred in the Caffe Cino's Babel, Babel, Little Tower in June 1961, portraying a waitress, followed by a role as a dancer in Now She Dances! (also 1961), the latter directed by Doric Wilson.

In 1963, she starred in a Michael Kahn-directed production of War, opposite Jerome Dempsey and Gerome Ragni. The following year, she starred in a Broadway production of Poor Bitos at the Cort Theatre. In 1969, she starred as Olga in a Circle Repertory Company production Anton Chekhov's Three Sisters, directed by Marshall W. Mason, followed by the Circle Repertory's A Practical Ritual (1970), in which she co-starred with Spalding Gray.

She made her feature film debut with an unknown role in Believe in Me (1971), originally titled Speed is of Essence. She subsequently had a major supporting role as the aunt of a child suspected in the murder of her sister in Alice, Sweet Alice (1976). Appearing in Cracks at the Theatre de Lys in 1976, Emory Lewis of the Hackensack Record positively compared Lowry to Eve Arden, an actress she was often compared to as they bore similar features. In 1979, Lowry starred as Miss Sophie Gluck in a Hudson Theatre production of Tennessee Williams's A Lovely Sunday for Creve Coeur. In 1981, Lowry co-starred with Holland Taylor in the ABC Afterschool Special My Mother Was Never a Kid.

Death
Lowry died in New York City on November 15, 2019, following a brief illness.

Filmography

Select stage credits

References

Sources

External links

Actresses from Minneapolis
American film actresses
American stage actresses
Northwestern University alumni